Krishna Kumari was an Indian politician . She was a Member of Parliament, representing Madhya  Pradesh in the Rajya Sabha the upper house of India's Parliament as a member of the Indian National Congress.

References

1908 births
1962 deaths
Rajya Sabha members from Madhya Pradesh
Indian National Congress politicians from Madhya Pradesh
Women in Madhya Pradesh politics
Women members of the Rajya Sabha